The 2016 Futsal Intercontinental Cup is the 17th edition of the world's premier club futsal tournament, and the 11th edition under FIFA recognition. It is organized by the Qatar Football Association in association with the Liga Nacional de Fútbol Sala.

Atlântico are the defending champions, but were not invited for this edition.

Format
In the group stage, teams were drawn into groups of four teams. In each group, teams play against each other in a round-robin mini-tournament.

In the knockout stage, the four qualified teams (two from each group) play the semi-finals. The winners of the semi-finals qualify for the final match, to be played on 29 June 2016. The remaining teams play in a series of placement matches to determine the final standings.

Teams
The following 8 teams were invited for the tournament.

Venues
The games of the tournament were played in Doha.

Group stage

Group A

Group B

Knockout stage

Bracket

Semi-finals

Third-place match

Final

References

2016 in futsal
2016 in Qatari sport
International club association football competitions hosted by Qatar
Sports competitions in Doha
June 2016 sports events in Asia